Leanne Choo (born 5 June 1991) is a badminton player from Australia. She is the reigning Oceania Champion in women's and mixed doubles. She represented Australia at the 2012 Summer Olympics, alongside former women's doubles partner, Renuga Veeran. Choo also competed at the 2016 Summer Olympics.

Personal
Leanne Choo, nicknamed Choo, was born in Adelaide, South Australia. She attended Glen Osmond Primary School and graduated from Glenunga International High School. In 2010, she enrolled at the University of Adelaide to pursue a degree in architecture and is now pursuing a degree in Neuroscience.

Choo is a member of the Sturt Badminton Club, the largest badminton club in South Australia.

Career

Early career – 2012 
Choo started playing badminton when she was eight years old. She rose to prominence as a junior, becoming the first South Australian to win a triple crown at a national event. Due to her ongoing success, she was made a member of the Australian National Team. As a member of the national team, she is based at the Melbourne Sports and Aquatic Centre, in Melbourne, Victoria.

Choo has represented Australia multiple times including at the 2006, 2007 and 2009 BWF World Junior Championships. She continued representing Australia at a junior level at the 2007 Australian Youth Olympic Festival in Sydney and the 2008 Commonwealth Youth Games in Pune, India. Her senior debut was at the 2010 Uber Cup in Kuala Lumpur, Malaysia. She also competed at the 2012 edition in Wuhan, China. Choo has also represented Australia at the World Mixed Team Championships, the Sudirman Cup in 2011 and 2015.

At the 2010 Commonwealth Games in Delhi, India, Choo began her partnership with Renuga Veeran. The pair almost staged an upset in the quarterfinals against the number one seeds from Singapore, Yao Lei and Shinta Mulia Sari. This was the first international tournament in which Choo and Veeran competed. The duo officially formed their partnership soon afterwards.

Choo and Veeran competed at the 2011 BWF World Championships in London where they reached the second round. The pair demolished Steffi Annys and Severine Corvilain of Germany 21–6, 21–9 in the first round before losing to 10th seeds, and eventual bronze medalists of the 2012 Summer Olympics, Valeria Sorokina and Nina Vislova of Russia in three games.

2012 Summer Olympics 
Choo was part of Australia's badminton team contingent at the 2012 Summer Olympics in London, her Olympic debut as a 21-year-old. At the end of the Olympic qualifying period, Choo and Veeran were ranked 35th in the world. During the qualifying process, their ranking peaked at 26. At the 2012 Summer Olympics, Choo and Veeran performed well in their round robin matches, thrashing their South African opponents and staying in contention with their Korean and Indonesian opponents, ranked world number three end eight respectively at the time. Unfortunately, they placed third in their pool and could not advance to the quarterfinals.

However, four pairs, including Meiliana Jauhari and Greysia Polii of Indonesia, and Ha Jung Eun and Kim Min Jung of Korea, were disqualified from the competition. The pairings were disqualified for "not using one's best efforts to win a match" and "conducting oneself in a manner that is clearly abusive or detrimental to the sport" as they were intentionally trying to lose matches in order to secure an easier quarterfinal draw.

Choo and Veeran therefore advanced to the quarterfinals, where they were defeated by Alex Bruce and Michelle Li of Canada. They finished in 5th place, the best result in Australia's history of Olympic badminton.

Results from 2012 Summer Olympics

2014 – present 
In April 2014, Choo formed her partnership with Robin Middleton in mixed doubles. In June 2016, the pair qualified for the 2016 Rio Summer Olympics.  She also competed at the 2018 Commonwealth Games, in both the women's doubles, with Veeran, and the mixed team.

Achievements

Oceania Championships
Women's singles

Women's doubles

Mixed doubles

BWF International Challenge/Series
Women's doubles

Mixed doubles

 BWF International Challenge tournament
 BWF International Series tournament
 BWF Future Series tournament

References

External links
 
 
 
 
 
 

1991 births
Living people
Sportspeople from Adelaide
Australian people of Chinese descent
Australian female badminton players
Badminton players at the 2016 Summer Olympics
Badminton players at the 2012 Summer Olympics
Olympic badminton players of Australia
Badminton players at the 2018 Commonwealth Games
Badminton players at the 2010 Commonwealth Games
Commonwealth Games competitors for Australia
Sportswomen from South Australia
University of Adelaide alumni